Pulaski is a station on the Chicago 'L' system, serving the Blue Line's Forest Park branch. The station is located in the median of the Eisenhower Expressway and serves the West Garfield Park neighborhood. A long ramp connects the platform to the station house on the Pulaski Road overpass. There was originally a similar entrance from the Keeler Avenue overpass; the entrance from Keeler was closed to cut costs on January 15, 1973, but retained as an exit, and the exit was fully closed on December 28, 1978.  The structure for this exit still stands but it is closed to the public.

Bus connections 
CTA
  7 Harrison (Weekdays only) 
  53 Pulaski (Owl Service)

References

External links 

 Pulaski (Congress Line) Station Page
 Pulaski Station in 1958 @ America on the Move (Smithsonian Institution)
Keeler Avenue entrance (closed) from Google Maps Street View
Pulaski Road entrance from Google Maps Street View

CTA Blue Line stations
Railway stations in the United States opened in 1958